The Spring Hill Historic District is a historic district roughly bounded by Summer, Central, Atherton, and Spring Streets in the Spring Hill area of Somerville, Massachusetts.  The district encompasses the city's best-preserved residential subdivision from the mid-19th century, with later infill construction in the late 19th and early 20th centuries.  The district was listed on the National Register of Historic Places in 1989.

Most development took place in the neighborhood between the 1840s and early 1900s. Spring Hill has a fine selection of Greek Revival houses and Victorians including Italianates, Gothic Revivals and Queen Annes. Large houses were built in the neighborhood as well as smaller workers' houses and attached houses. In the early 1900s triple-deckers filled in the remaining land.

Description and history
Spring Hill is a glacial drumlin with an elongated summit roughly north of Summer Street, between Lowell and Cedar Streets in central Somerville.  Its name derives from a spring that was useful for farmers who originally settled the area in the 17th century.  The construction of the Boston and Lowell Railroad in the 1840s, with a station at the base of the hill, spurred residential construction in the area for businessmen working in Charlestown and Boston.  The tract of land making up this district was purchased by George Brastow, a native of Wrentham who later became Somerville's first mayor.  Recognizing the potential for development, Brastow hired Alexander Wadsworth to lay out housing lots.

The historic district is roughly L-shaped, and is bounded on the north by Summer Street, on the west by Spring Street, on the south by Atherton Street as far as Beech Street, on the east by Central Street (between Summer and Monmouth Streets) and Harvard Street (further south to Atherton).  It includes 69 historically significant buildings, most of which were built during the area's first major period of development, 1845-1870.  A second period of construction 1885-1910 resulted in the infill construction of additional buildings, including the 1898 Martin W. Carr School, the only non-residential building in the district.

The oldest buildings in the district include seven of the first eight houses built after Brastow's subdivision; these are all Greek Revival two-family residences, of which 46-48 Atherton Street is the least altered.  The Italianate Round House was built at Atherton and Beech Streets in 1856, and remains a local curiosity.  Its builder, Enoch Robinson, also built the fine Italianate house at 47 Spring Street, which is one of the finest examples of that style in the city.

Most of the buildings in the district are wood frame structures, with one to three housing units.  Most were not architect designed; there is only one house, 152 Summer Street, that has been definitely attributed to an architect.  In this case it was local architect George Loring, who is known to have designed more than 100 residences in the city, although only a few survive.  The c. 1890 Rymes House at 49 Spring Street may also be a Loring design.

See also
National Register of Historic Places listings in Somerville, Massachusetts

References

Historic districts in Middlesex County, Massachusetts
Queen Anne architecture in Massachusetts
Shingle Style architecture in Massachusetts
Neighborhoods in Somerville, Massachusetts
Hills of Massachusetts
National Register of Historic Places in Somerville, Massachusetts
Historic districts on the National Register of Historic Places in Massachusetts